Softly and Tenderly is a studio album by American country music singer-songwriter Bill Anderson. It was released on June 1, 2005, on Madacy Entertainment and TWI Records. The album was Anderson's 39th studio recording and was his third album collection of gospel music.

Background, content and release
Softly & Tenderly was Anderson's third collection of gospel recordings. His first album was released in 1968 titled I Can Do Nothing Alone. Anderson recorded the title track of the latter album for his 2005 collection. He spoke of his decision to record a new gospel project in 2005. "I was going into the studio last winter to do a new country record, and Jack Johnson came to me and said, 'We've gotten quite a few calls out in the marketplace for some country gospel'," he recalled. The album consisted of 11 tracks. Many of the songs included on the project were covers of popular gospel and Christian songs. This included "Love Lifted Me", "I Saw the Light" and "Life's Railway to Heaven".

Softly & Tenderly was released on June 1, 2004, via TWI Records. The latter label was Anderson's own recording company, which issued the album on a compact disc. The album was later licensed through Madacy Entertainment. The album was sold at major retailers including Wal-Mart and Target. The album did not chart on any publication at the time of its release, including Billboard. In his review, Allmusic's Steve Leggett gave the album three out of five possible stars. "He's done a little of everything, including gospel, as this brief set shows, featuring Anderson's gentle vocal style on several country gospel classics like 'The Old Rugged Cross,' 'I Saw the Light,' 'Life's Railway to Heaven,' and 'Farther Along.'

Track listing

Personnel
All credits are adapted from Allmusic.

Musical and technical personnel
 Bill Anderson – lead vocals, producer
 Eva Liranzo – cover design
 Mike Toppins – producer

Release history

References

2005 albums
Albums produced by Bill Anderson (singer)
Bill Anderson (singer) albums
Christian music albums by American artists